Tyrone Borough Historic District is a national historic district located at Tyrone, Blair County, Pennsylvania.  The district includes 349 contributing buildings and 2 contributing structures in the central business district and surrounding residential areas of Tyrone.  The earliest buildings date to the 1850s, when the community was expanded as a junction town for the Pennsylvania Railroad. The buildings are primarily frame and brick, with notable examples of Late Victorian style architecture. Notable non-residential buildings include the Garman Building (1890), Hiller Building (1892), I.O.O.F Building, Jones Building (1906), White House Bed and Breakfast (1855), and St. Matthews Catholic Church (1880).  Also located in the district are a railroad bed and viaduct (c. 1900) and road bridge at East 10th Street and Blair Avenue (c. 1900).  Located in the district and separately listed is the Tyrone Armory.

It was added to the National Register of Historic Places in 1993.

External links
 Tyrone Historical Society walking tour of Historic District

References

Historic districts on the National Register of Historic Places in Pennsylvania
Historic districts in Blair County, Pennsylvania
National Register of Historic Places in Blair County, Pennsylvania